Carol Forman (19 June 1919, Epes, Alabama – 9 July 1997, Burbank, California) was an American actress best known for playing exotic villains in action serials, particularly Spider Lady in the 1948 Superman serial, as well as Sombra, the lead villainess in the 1947 Republic serial The Black Widow.

Early life
Born Maude Carolyn Sawls in Epes, Alabama on July 19, 1919 (some sources indicate 1918), the eldest of two children of Edward D. Sawls, a carpenter, and Annabelle Fleming, a homemaker. Her interest in acting began as a youngster. By the time she was six years old, she was starring in school plays. She would continuing acting throughout high school.

As a teenager, she moved to Memphis.  While in Memphis, she worked as a cosmetics salesperson. It was there that she met and married her first husband, Robert D. Forman in 1940. The marriage didn't last long.

Career

By the mid-1940s, Forman had moved to California. While working in small community theater productions, mostly in unsympathetic roles, she was discovered by a talent scout from RKO Pictures. In 1946, RKO signed her to a contract. One of her early roles was playing Raymond Burr's girlfriend in his first film, Code of the West. She played opposite Burr again in San Quentin.

However, Forman would be best known for appearing in movie serials.

In serials, Forman differed from other actresses by playing villainesses exclusively. Her characters occasionally used disguises to go undercover or to impersonate other characters, in the same manner as Batman, or Artemis Gordon in The Wild Wild West TV series years later. In 1952, in the nostalgic musical comedy By the Light of the Silvery Moon starring Doris Day, Forman spoofed her serial persona by appearing briefly as an evil woman in a young boy's daydream.

She also made guest appearances on The Cisco Kid starring Duncan Renaldo and Leo Carillo in the early 1950s.

Filmography

Death

She died in Burbank, California on July 9, 1997, of natural causes.

References

External links

1919 births
1997 deaths
American television actresses
Actresses from Alabama
20th-century American actresses